Harry Leland, also known as the Black Bishop, is a supervillain appearing in American comic books published by Marvel Comics. The character has been depicted as an adversary of the X-Men.

Leland possesses the mutant ability to increase the mass of an object or person, making it extremely heavy. Thanks to his allegiance to Sebastian Shaw, he attained the rank of Black Bishop of the Lords Cardinal of the New York branch of The Hellfire Club, an exclusive secret society bent on world domination. In civilian life, he was a corporate lawyer.

Publication history
Created by writer Chris Claremont and artist/co-writer John Byrne, Leland first appeared in The Uncanny X-Men #132 (April 1980).

Artist John Byrne based Leland's appearance on actor-director Orson Welles, and the name refers to two characters in Welles' films: Harry Lime from The Third Man, and Jed Leland from Citizen Kane.

The character subsequently appears in The Uncanny X-Men #132-135 (April–July 1980), #152 (Dec. 1981), and #208–209 (August–September 1986), in which he died. Leland made subsequent posthumous appearances in Classic X-Men #7 (March 1987), The Sensational She-Hulk #34–35 (Dec. 1991–Jan. 1992), Marvel Super-Heroes #11 (Oct. 1992), Generation X #-1 (July 1997), X-Men: Hellfire Club #4 (April 2000), X-Men Unlimited #6 (Feb. 2005), and House of M: Avengers#5 (2008).

Fictional character biography

Hellfire Club
Little is known of Leland's past before encountering the X-Men, although he did encounter former teammate, Emma Frost, before she was inducted into the Hellfire Club. At the time, Emma was homeless and using her powers during a Hellfire Club meeting to gain information about stocks. Leland takes an interest in her but comes on too strongly, and Emma runs away.  Shortly after, he accompanies Sean Cassidy and his NYPD partner to an incident behind the club which involves Emma. Emma, having met and repaired the fractured mind of the Dark Beast with her powers, mind-wipes all three men into forgetting the incident and that they had ever met.

Leland encounters the X-Men when they invade the New York headquarters of the Hellfire Club. Leland causes Wolverine to become increasingly heavy until he falls through the floor into a sub-basement. In the rematch, Wolverine attacks Leland from above. Leland panics and uses his mass-increasing powers, resulting in Wolverine crashing through the floor again, this time with Leland beneath him. Leland is hospitalized as a result. When the Hellfire Club again captures the X-Men weeks later, Leland takes revenge by using his power on Wolverine until his heart gives out, though his rival's death proves to be a temporary state induced by Amanda Sefton.

Alongside the Hellfire Club, Leland battles the X-Men in New York's Central Park. When Nimrod attacks the assembled mutants, the X-Men and the Club join forces to battle Nimrod. Leland increases Nimrod's mass to make it more vulnerable to attack. Overweight and in poor health, the effort triggers a heart attack. At Storm's urging, Leland increases the mass of Sebastian Shaw (who had been sent hurtling towards outer space), causing Shaw to crash into Nimrod. Leland succumbs to his heart condition and dies.

X-Humed
The supervillain Black Talon revives Leland's body as a zombie, and sets him and other undead mutants (Changeling, Living Diamond, and Scaleface) against She-Hulk. She defeats them, and Leland is reburied, with precautions are taken to ensure that he never will come back, among them filling his mouth with salt and sewing his lips together.

Necrosha
Despite the precautions made to prevent Leland's body from coming back as a zombie, the psychic vampire Selene revives Leland with the use of a modified version of the Transmode virus during the Necrosha storyline.

Leland is sent to Utopia with Shinobi Shaw, who was revived by the same means, to kill Sebastian Shaw, Donald Pierce, Emma Frost, Magma and the X-Men.

Reign of X
Under the X-Men 2019 reboot of Dawn of X and Reign of X, Leland is resurrected to provide the new mutant island nation of Krakoa with an ambassador in the United Nations. It is also revealed that he is in fact Shinobi Shaw's biological father.

Powers and abilities
Leland possesses the ability to increase the mass of an object or person within  of him, without affecting its size at all, making it increasingly heavy. Though he can only increase mass up to roughly 20 kilograms per second, there is seemingly no limit to the total mass he can add to a person or object. Leland's power can affect both people and inanimate objects, but active resistance by the subject makes it more difficult to assert Leland's power. Leland is overweight and in poor health, and thus he is a poor hand-to-hand combatant.

Other versions

House of M
In an alternate universe depicted in "House of M", Harry Leland is the Commissioner of the NYPD.

In other media

Television
 Harry Leland appears in the X-Men: The Animated Series four-part episode "The Dark Phoenix" as a member of the Inner Circle Club.
 Harry Leland appears in the Wolverine and the X-Men three-part episode "Foresight" as a member of the Inner Circle. He assists the group in their efforts to transfer the Phoenix Force from Jean Grey to the Stepford Cuckoos, only to be killed in the process.
 Harry Leland makes a cameo appearance a flashback in the Marvel Anime: X-Men episode "The Return - Joining Forces" as a member of the Hellfire Club.

Film
Harry Leland, among other members of the Hellfire Club, was originally planned to appear in Dark Phoenix, but was ultimately cut from the film.

References

External links
 

Comics characters introduced in 1980
Characters created by Chris Claremont
Characters created by John Byrne (comics)
Fictional businesspeople
Fictional lawyers
Fictional undead
Male characters in comics
Marvel Comics male supervillains
Marvel Comics mutants
Marvel Comics supervillains